The Milman Baronetcy, of Levaton-in-Woodland in the County of Devon, is a title in the Baronetage of Great Britain. It was created on 28 November 1800 for Francis Milman, Physician-in-Ordinary to King George III and President of the Royal College of Physicians. The seventh Baronet was a brigadier-general in the British Army.

Milman baronets, of Levaton-in-Woodland (1800)
 Sir Francis Milman, 1st Baronet (1746–1821)
 Sir William George Milman, 2nd Baronet (1781–1857)
 Sir William Milman, 3rd Baronet (1813–1885)
 Sir Francis John Milman, 4th Baronet (1842–1922)
 Sir Francis Milman, 5th Baronet (1872–1946)
 Sir William Ernest Milman, 6th Baronet (1875–1962)
 Sir Lionel Charles Patrick Milman, 7th Baronet (1877–1962)
 Sir Dermot Lionel Kennedy Milman, 8th Baronet (1912–1990)
 Sir Derek Milman, 9th Baronet (1918–1999)
 Sir David Patrick Milman, 10th Baronet (born 1945)

Extended family
Francis Miles Milman (1783–1856), second son of the first Baronet, was a lieutenant-general in the Coldstream Guards. He was the father of (1) Egerton Charles William Miles Milman, a major-general in the Army, and (2) Gustavus Hamilton Lockwood Milman (died 1915), a major-general in the Royal Artillery. The latter married Louisa Mary, suo jure 15th Baroness Berkeley. Their daughter Eva Mary succeeded her mother in the barony (see Baron Berkeley for further history of this title).
The Very Reverend Henry Hart Milman, third son of the first Baronet, was a historian and ecclesiastic.

Notes

Milman
1800 establishments in Great Britain